Joe Todd may refer to:
 Joe Todd (footballer), New Zealand footballer
 Joe Todd (American football), American football linebacker

See also
 Joseph Todd, American football defensive back